Elections to the Uttar Pradesh Legislative Assembly were held in February 1969, to elect members of the 425 constituencies in Uttar Pradesh, India. The Indian National Congress won the most seats as well as the popular vote, and Chandra Bhanu Gupta was appointed the Chief Minister of Uttar Pradesh.

The state had been under President's Rule since February 1968. After the passing of The Delimitation of Parliamentary and Assembly Constituencies Order, 1961, the constituencies were set to the ones used in this election. In this election Bharatiya Kranti Dal led by Charan Singh contested for the first time and won 98 Seats.

Result

Elected Members

Bypolls

See also
List of constituencies of the Uttar Pradesh Legislative Assembly
1969 elections in India

References

Uttar Pradesh
1969
1969